Atlanta CV (originally known as The Atlanta CorpsVets) is an all-age drum and bugle corps that competes in the Drum Corps Associates circuit. It was founded in 1997 and is one of two competitive corps in the state of Georgia, alongside Spirit of Atlanta.

History

Founding 
The Atlanta CorpsVets started as a simple idea of Robin and Tracey Wofford and Tom and Janet Walsh in conjunction with American Legion Post #1 in the summer of 1997. The Woffords attended a senior corps show in Wisconsin and felt the time was right for Atlanta to have its own senior corps. Robin and Tracey contacted friends and contacts of their drum corps days and began recruiting at a local drum corps event held at Jacksonville State University. 

The first rehearsal of the corps was in January 1998, with basics block rehearsals conducted throughout Piedmont Park. The very first performance was at the 1998 St. Patrick's Day Parade in Atlanta.

That summer, the corps boasted a membership of 44 performers and performed exhibitions at a local Drum Corps International competition as well as marched in the WSB-TV Salute 2 America Parade in downtown Atlanta. The final performance that inaugural season was at the Drum Corps Associates Championship in Allentown, Pennsylvania where several members represented the corps in the Individual and Ensemble Competition.

Growth and Results 
In 1999 the corps grew to 55 members and traveled to the DCA Championships, placing 4th in the mini-corps competition.  Growth continued in 2000, with the corps featuring 56 members and placing second at the DCA Championships in the Class A division.  In 2001 the CorpsVets grew to 65 members and won the Class A title at the DCA championships with a record score in that division.

The following year, 2002, the corps grew to 94 members, advanced to the highly competitive Open Class Division of DCA and tied for 11th place at the championships.  Since 2002 the corps has competed in Open Class attaining finalist status each season fielding corps of over 100 members.

In 2012 the corps shorten its name to Atlanta CV Drum and Bugle Corps, adopting the "CV" moniker already often used to refer to the "CorpsVets".  This rebranding helped eliminate the misconception that a member must be a vet of a corps in order to participate, which was never the case.

The corps' highest placement coincides with their highest score, set at the 2017 DCA Championships finals, with a score of 96.63 and 2nd place overall.  They are the 10 Time DCA South Champions and the highest placing and highest scoring southern corps in DCA History.

Show Summary (1998-2023)

CV Indoor
In 2015, Atlanta CV came out with an indoor percussion program, headed by percussion caption head and arranger Chris Romanowski. The ensemble competed in Winter Guard International (WGI) Percussion Independent World Class. The following year, 2016, the organization decided not to come out with an indoor line, partly due to a large majority of staff and potential members going on a trip to China that took place during the heat of the season.  In 2017, Atlanta CV Indoor had returned to the competition arena, competing in WGI Percussion Independent Open Class. In 2018, Atlanta CV Indoor announced a merger with Q2, another Open Class group also based in Atlanta. As a result, staff and resources were brought together and CV Indoor would now be under the Q2 name.

References

External links
 Official site

Non-profit organizations based in Georgia (U.S. state)
Organizations established in 1997
Drum Corps Associates corps
1997 establishments in Georgia (U.S. state)